Feiyue is a shoe brand founded in Shanghai. The China owner is Dafu Rubber Co., Ltd., located in Shanghai. The Worldwide Owner was acquired by Feiyue International, a subsidiary of BBC International in the United States, in 2014.

The "Feiyue" name translates "to leap" or "to fly over." The name during creation was resonant of the Great Leap Forward.

The shoes were first produced in Shanghai during the 1920s. Since 2006 there have been two separate companies creating Feiyue shoes: Da Fu Rubber and its subsidiary manufacturer, Double Coin Holdings, and a French company operating separately from the original Chinese company.

A number of performers wore Feiyue China shoes during the opening of the 2008 Beijing Olympic Games, showing that they are still in common use in China. People who did parkour liked the original, authentic version because it was light and had thin soles. Actor Orlando Bloom was spotted wearing the American version of Feiyue shoes, leading to a resurgence in interest in the brand.

The Chinese factory has 3,000 employees producing 36,000 pairs a day, with an average of 5,000,000 pairs a ysold ear solChina.

In 2006, Patrice Bastian, a Frenchman, ordered 3,000 pairs of the sneakers and began selling them abroad. Bastian claimed he bought the rights to sell the shoes outside China, while Shuang Qian Group, which holds Feiyue's rights in China denies the same. The Chinese company filed a case in a French court against Bastian's company but lost the lawsuit.

History 
Feiyue's roots can be traced to the 1920s, when cloth shoes were manufactured in Shanghai. In 1958, DaFu Rubber Company (大孚橡胶厂) designed and produced a kind of civil Jiefang shoe (解放鞋) known as "Feiyue", a modification of the cloth shoes used by the Shaolin monks. They gained popularity during the 30s for their robustness, flexibility, and comfort which were considered essential requirements for martial arts and various forms of athletics. The shoes are a staple for almost all wushu practitioners and athletes in China ,with the shoes even being used by numerous shaolin monks and Kung Fu masters.

In 1963, using Feiyue and double arrow-labeled chevrons with "Feiyue track and field", the company became the best-selling shoe in China with an output of 1,616,000 pairs. Feiyue chas been popular for many decades, and the original company has sold hundreds of thousands of shoes since it started. This is still going on toay. The shoes are a popular export ,,ith numerous foreign martial arts clubs and schools importing them as the standard shoes for their students. With the opening up of China and the associated cultural and economic shifts, the sneaker began to lose prominence in China. Famous indoor football coach Xu Genbao and player Qi Hong participated in contests wearing Feiyue track and field shoes.

In 2005, Patrice Bastian, an entrepreneur and marketing and events manager who lived in Shanghai, got together with a group of artists to change the brand name. The goal was to make Feiyue look and sound better. Nicolas Seguy and Clement Fauth were on his team that redesigned Feiyue for modern consumers in the West. In February 2006, they launched the first French-designed Feiyue Shoe collection.

The DaFu Rubber Company reorganized and sold the rights to Feiyue to the "Shuang Qian Group Co. Ltd", in 2009. That company would then lease manufacturing back to DaFu and another manufacturer, "Top One" (大博文), both traditional producers of Feiyue shoes.

In 2014, BBC International, the Boca Raton, Florida-based footwear firm, acquired the French Feiyue shoe company. Upon working with BBC, Feiyue's men's, women's, and children's collections were updated and globally introduced in Spring of 2015.

BBC has made a large new collection that builds on its existing brand. It has fashion-forward styling, updated silhouettes, and high-quality materials like leather and skins.

In 2015, BBC International Launched a collaboration with Feiyue and Peanuts for a limited-edition collection. Before BBC's acquisition deal in August 2014, Feiyue had major success in collaborations, including collections with Celine, André, Casio, Bonton, NSBQ, and more; and continuing with other collaborations beginning with Peanuts.

The American Feiyue company collaborated in 2016 with the Solid & Striped clothing company, with textiles based on Solid & Striped designs.

Intellectual property rights dispute 
A dispute exists surrounding the trademark and intellectual property rights to Feiyue between the United States-owned company, Feiyue International, LLC, and Shanghai Da Fu Rubber Co, the company that originally manufactured the shoe. Liu Qinglong, manager of Shanghai Da Fu Rubber Co Ltd, said of the situation in 2017, “No one in China knew about commodity intellectual property rights at the time and it wasn’t until 2007–08 that we found out the French had registered the trademark.”  According to the Young Post: "Liu claims the French company took advantage of the Chinese at a time when China was still grappling with capitalism and transitioning from all factories being state-owned assets to devolving some rights to individual businesses."

Patrice Bastian, former co-founder and creative director of Feiyue International, LLC, labels Chinese Feiyue "counterfeit," claiming "Feiyue in the US are the original ones because we have the brand registration." He also comments, "It's actually a legal issue and there are many things that we cannot control."

According to Bastian, while he was living in Asia in 2005, he became enamored of Feiyue's white vulcanized shoes. A sneaker collector, Bastien traveled to the factory to buy his lifetime supply and ended up making a bid to buy the brand (with partners Nicolas Seguy and Clement Fauth), financing the purchase by selling his sneaker collection. However, Da Fu maintains that Bastien made this purchase from a manufacturer and not from them, the original company, having not heard of the Bastian at all until 2007. In 2017, Bastian claims that he didn't know exactly who owned the factory he purchased the brand from.

Da Fu retains the trademark rights to Feiyue in China, but the US-based Feiyue holds the rights in much of the world, including France, Australia, New Zealand, South Korea, and Taiwan. Da Fu took Feiyue International, LLC to court for the rights in France, but lost the lawsuit. As such, the US-based Feiyue retains the rights regarding their trademarks, trade names, brand names, and trade dress, and claims protection by international laws and treaties.

Distinctions between the original authentic Chinese and re-designed American versions 
The original Chinese versions of the Feiyue shoes and the re-designed American versions have a number of differences. The differences include:

Sole 
The sole of the Chinese Feiyue shoe contains reduced padding on the bottom of the shoe, which is considered desirable for martial arts activities. The sole of the French version has thicker padding on the bottom and is designed for more general-purpose use. The seal at the center of the sole is a green triangle on the Chinese Feiyue, while the marking is a red circle on the American version. However, recently the Chinese version manufactured by Da Fu has begun to use the American red circle; those manufactured by Top One retain the green triangle.

Canvas material 
The canvas material of the Chinese Feiyue shoe is thin, resulting in a large range of ankle flexibility. The martial arts application requires a wide range of foot motions. The canvas material of the American version is much thicker.

Color 
The original Chinese Feiyues originally came in only two colors, black and white, with a HI and LO version of each. The shoes were previously only available in a limited range of styles—simple stripes with some different colors. The range of colors and styles has now grown tremendously both under the American-owned company and the Chinese-owned one, with the BBC International brand offering a wide variety of colors and the Da Fu brand offering a "rainbow" set of shoes.

Style 
The American version of the shoe offers a wide variety of fashion-forward choices for men, women, and kids. Consequently, collaborations with Céline, Agnès B, and Swarovski followed, as did fans, including Miranda Kerr, Reese Witherspoon, and Orlando Bloom. The Chinese version of the shoe, on the other hand, has around 150 different styles of the shoes catered toward Chinese fashion tastes.

References

External links

 Chinese Feiyue DaFu website 
 English global website

Shoe companies of China
Companies based in Shanghai
Chinese brands
Shoe brands
Sporting goods brands